Lucie Hradecká and Renata Voráčová were the defending champions but chose not to participate that year.
Eleni Daniilidou and Jasmin Wöhr defeated Maria Kondratieva and Vladimíra Uhlířová 6–4, 1–6, [11–9] in the final.

Seeds

Draw

Draw

References

İstanbul Cup
Istanbul Cup - Doubles